ABSA Stadium usually refers to Kings Park Stadium, a stadium in Durban, known for sponsorship reasons as ABSA Stadium.

ABSA Stadium may also refer to:

Buffalo City Stadium, a stadium previously known as ABSA Stadium (East London)
Griqua Park, a stadium in Kimberley, previously known as ABSA Park